Speicher is a Verbandsgemeinde ("collective municipality") in the district Bitburg-Prüm, in Rhineland-Palatinate, Germany. The seat of the Verbandsgemeinde is in Speicher.

The Verbandsgemeinde Speicher consists of the following Ortsgemeinden ("local municipalities"):

 Auw an der Kyll 
 Beilingen 
 Herforst 
 Hosten 
 Orenhofen 
 Philippsheim 
 Preist 
 Spangdahlem 
 Speicher

Verbandsgemeinde in Rhineland-Palatinate